Etna Township is one of seventeen townships in Kosciusko County, Indiana. As of the 2010 census, its population was 1,503 and it contained 540 housing units.

Geography

Cities and towns
 Etna Green

References

External links
 Indiana Township Association
 United Township Association of Indiana

Townships in Kosciusko County, Indiana
Townships in Indiana